Crossville is a town in DeKalb County, Alabama, United States. At the 2010 census the population was 1,862, up from 1,431 in 2000. Crossville is located atop Sand Mountain, a southern extension of the Cumberland Plateau.

History
Crossville is a farming community in northeast Alabama, situated on the sandstone plateau of Sand Mountain. The native peoples called the plateau Raccoon Mountain. It holds some historical significance for having figured tangentially in the Creek War.. The area's soil, game, climate, and proximity to streams proved attractive to settlers, the majority of whom were drawn there from neighboring states following the expulsion of the indigenous Creeks..

Sand Mountain lay in an area that included disputed borders between the Creeks and the Cherokee. Although Alabama became a state in 1819, until the 1830s much of northern Alabama was still officially Cherokee territory. However, white settlement in the area increased steadily, coming to a head with the gold rush in the nearby mountains of northwest Georgia. While gold supplies began to dwindle, soon eclipsed by the California Gold Rush, the settlement by white farmers continued and played prominently in the expulsion of Cherokee, Creek and Choctaw nations from the area. That expulsion is called the Trail of Tears, considered an act of genocide because of the thousands who died on the journey, and the forced removal of native peoples from their home territories. (In nearby Fort Payne, which lies across the valley and at the foot of next-door Lookout Mountain, there is a historical sign marking the town as one of the starting points for the Trail of Tears, and also the area where Sequoyah lived, who developed the Cherokee alphabet.)

During the times of slavery, Crossville, Sand Mountain and DeKalb County, where Crossville is located, were not major slave areas.  This can be verified by a study of census rolls which reveal a mostly poor area, where people worked and survived by the labor of their own hands, rather than the forced labor of captive Africans and their descendants. Leading up to the Civil War, DeKalb County was typical of Southern mountain counties in that it voted against secession from the United States. This can be corroborated by a study of the roster of the votes on this issue, county by county. In fact, there was serious discussion among Northern Alabama and East Tennessee counties about forming a proposed state of Nickajack, rather than going along with secession.

During the Civil War, DeKalb County families, particularly families from mountain terrains such as Sand and Lookout Mountain, tended at first to avoid fighting, since it was considered a "rich man's war", and not of particular interest to mountain people. However, as the war progressed, many DeKalb County families fought for Union cavalries, notably the 1st Tennessee & Alabama Independent Vidette Cavalry and the 1st Alabama Cavalry Regiment.  A perusal of the cavalries' rosters will reveal family names that to this day are prominent in the area. The First Alabama Cavalry was particularly notable in that it was one of the few units that was racially integrated.

Crossville's name, given to it by James A. Copeland (1880–1964), not to be confused with the outlaw James Copeland), was meant to reflect its many crossroads.

In the mid-19th century, mail was brought through Crossville from Rome, Georgia, and Guntersville, Alabama, via stagecoach. Soon the town had its first U.S. post office, with A.C. Copeland serving as the first postmaster. In 1888, George Wyatt Justice established the first business in Crossville, and in 1903, W.B. Jones installed machinery for his cotton mills. His son Loy Jones (spouse-Sara Jones) followed his footsteps and ran a once successful business in Crossville. Loy and Sara had a daughter named Pam, and she had two sons named Blake and Blane Raley. The Jones family was vital to the growth early on in Crossville.

The first church established in the Crossville area was a Methodist Episcopal Church called Pine Bark Church, formed just prior to the Civil War. The community's first Baptist church was established in 1892 at Union Grove east of the town center. In 1925, several people started meeting at the high school and formed the First Baptist Church of Crossville. A new sanctuary was built in 1926.

Crossville established its first school, a one-room structure with a single teacher and approximately 50 students, in the late 19th century at Bryant's Chapel Church. The first banking institution was established in 1914 by N.W. Black and Boyce Rains. Soon after, Crossville was granted provisional incorporation, and Charlie J. Crump was appointed first mayor. Little progress was made during his tenure, and the incorporation's dissolution followed quickly thereafter. The town was incorporated a second time on December 21, 1942. Dr. Luther F. Erwin was chosen mayor, and the town government established ordinances and levied privilege licenses. Collection enforcement was lax, however, resulting in insufficient resources to maintain basic town services. Following this, C.W. (Bill) Russell was elected mayor. He hired Colonel Mack Kilcrease as a legal adviser to mayor and council. This group worked together to establish a solid town government with taxation, collection and basic town services that would become the foundation for the Town of Crossville.

Geography
Crossville is located in southwestern DeKalb County at  (34.286752, -85.990814). Alabama State Route 68 is the main road through the town, leading east  to Interstate 59 at Collinsville and west  to Albertville. Alabama State Route 227 also passes through Crossville, leading north  to Geraldine and south  into Big Wills Valley.

Demographics

2020 census

As of the 2020 United States census, there were 1,830 people, 707 households, and 455 families residing in the town.

2010 census
As of the 2010 census Crossville had a population of 1,862.  The racial and ethnic composition of the population was 87.2% non-Hispanic white, 0.4% black, 1.9% Native American, 0.2% Asian, 0.1% Pacific Islander, 6.3% from some other race, 2.4% from two or more races and 8.3% Hispanic or Latino of any race.

2000 census
As of the census of 2000, there were 1,431 people, 539 households, and 365 families residing in the town. The racial makeup of the town was 97.69% White, 0.07% Black or African American, 0.49% Native American, 0.14% Asian, 0.07% Pacific Islander, 0.56% from other races, and 0.98% from two or more races. 2.24% of the population were Hispanic or Latino of any race.

There were 539 households, out of which 33.4% had children under the age of 18 living with them, 53.2% were married couples living together, 10.0% had a female householder with no husband present, and 32.1% were non-families. 30.6% of all households were made up of individuals, and 14.7% had someone living alone who was 65 years of age or older. The average household size was 2.42 and the average family size was 3.04.

In the town, the population was spread out, with 23.5% under the age of 18, 7.3% from 18 to 24, 27.8% from 25 to 44, 20.0% from 45 to 64, and 21.5% who were 65 years of age or older. The median age was 40 years. For every 100 females, there were 81.6 males. For every 100 females age 18 and over, there were 76.9 males.

The median income for a household in the town was $31,394, and the median income for a family was $44,667. Males had a median income of $27,708 versus $20,461 for females. The per capita income for the town was $14,326. About 11.0% of families and 15.2% of the population were below the poverty line, including 21.5% of those under age 18 and 29.3% of those age 65 or over.

Climate
Climate is characterized by relatively high temperatures and evenly distributed precipitation throughout the year. The Köppen Climate Classification subtype for this climate is "Cfa" (Humid Subtropical Climate).

Education
Crossville Elementary, Crossville Middle, and Crossville High, home of the Lions, are located in Crossville. All are members of the DeKalb County School System. Crossville, as of the school year 2016–2017, is a 5A school and has the largest classification in DeKalb County. The school colors are black and gold.

References

External links

Town of Crossville official website 

Towns in DeKalb County, Alabama
Towns in Alabama